Jean Mousté (born 2 January 1994) is a Guinean footballer who plays as a midfielder for Al-Diwaniya and the Guinea national team.

International career
Mousté made his debut with the Guinea national team in a 3–1 2016 African Nations Championship win over Liberia on 22 June 2015.

References

External links
 
 
 Hafia FC Profile

1994 births
Living people
People from Fria
Guinean footballers
Guinea international footballers
Association football midfielders
Hafia FC players
Guinée Championnat National players
Guinea A' international footballers
2016 African Nations Championship players
Guinean expatriate footballers
Expatriate footballers in Iraq
Guinean expatriate sportspeople in Iraq
2020 African Nations Championship players
Al-Diwaniya FC players